The 2010–11 season was Olympiacos's 52nd consecutive season in the Super League Greece and their 85th year in existence.

The season was marked by the return of Ernesto Valverde as head coach. Varverde took charge of the team about mid August after the club's failure to qualify to 2010–11 UEFA Europa League group stage.

Olympiacos finished first in the Greek Super League, winning the title after an unsuccessful 2009–10 season. This was Evangelos Marinakis' first season as chairman of the club.

Events
 14.06.10: Ewald Lienen is appointed as the new Olympiacos manager replacing Božidar Bandović, after a disappointing season under Bandović.
 21.06.10: Olympiacos enter the draw for the second qualifying round of the 2010–11 UEFA Europa League as the top seeded team and they are drawn to play against Besa of Albania. It is the first time that Olympiacos play directly in the UEFA Europa League after 13 consecutive seasons in the UEFA Champions League.
 15.07.10: Olympiacos smash Besa 5–0 at the Qemal Stafa Stadium in Tirana, Albania, in the first leg of the second qualifying round of the 2010–11 UEFA Europa League, achieving their biggest away win in European competitions.
 16.07.10: In the draw for the third qualifying round of the 2010–11 UEFA Europa League, Olympiacos are drawn to play the winners of the encounter between Maccabi Tel Aviv and Mogren.
 22.07.10: In the second leg, Olympiacos trounce Besa 6–1 at the Karaiskakis Stadium, setting a new club record for their biggest ever European home win, with their previous record being 5–0. They qualify for the next round of the tournament with an 11–1 win on aggregate, which is also a record aggregate score for a Greek football club in European competitions.
 05.08.10: Olympiacos are eliminated from the UEFA Europa League in the third qualifying round on away goals as the aggregate score is 2–2 against Maccabi Tel Aviv. A 2–1 win at the Karaiskakis Stadium in the first leg on 29.07.10 is compounded by a 1–0 loss at the Bloomfield Stadium in Tel Aviv, Israel, to secure the biggest surprise in the qualifyings.
 06.08.10: Olympiacos sack coach Ewald Lienen after the club's shocking elimination from the UEFA Europa League.
 07.08.10: Olympiacos reappoint Ernesto Valverde as manager.

Players

Current squad
As of 22 January 2011

Transfers

Summer

In:

Out:

Competitions

Super League

League table

Results summary

Results by round

Matches 
All times at EET

Goalscorers
This is the list of goalscorers in accordance with Super League Greece as organising body.

 Djebbour has scored 5 goals for AEK Athens and 7 for Olympiacos
 Maniatis has scored 1 goal for Panionios and 0 for Olympiacos
Source: 
Last updated:18 April 2011

Greek Cup

All times UTC+3

Fourth Round

Fifth Round

Quarter-finals

UEFA Europa League

Second qualifying round

Third qualifying round

Team kit

References

External links 
 Official Website of Olympiacos Piraeus 

2010-11
Greek football clubs 2010–11 season
2010–11